Nate Jensen is an American football coach.  He serves as the head coach at Manchester University in North Manchester, Indiana, a position he has held since 2016.

Head coaching record

References

External links
 Manchester profile

Year of birth missing (living people)
Living people
American football defensive ends
Alma Scots football coaches
Defiance Yellow Jackets football players
Manchester Spartans football coaches